Bijali (thunder Mahadeva temple) Mahadeva Mandir is a located in Kashawri village, Kullu Valley in the Indian state of Himachal Pradesh.  It is located at an altitude of about 2,460m in the Kullu Valley. Bijli Mahadev is one of the ancient temples in India and dedicated to Lord Shiva
(Mahadev). Located 14 km from Kullu across the Beas river, it can be approached by a rewarding trek of 3 km.

A panoramic view of Kullu and Paravati valleys can be seen from the temple. The 60 feet high staff of Bijli Mahadev temple glistens like a silver needle in the sun.

In this temple of lightning, it is said that the tall staff attracts the divine blessings in the form of lightning.

Every 12 years, the Shiv lingam is struck by lightning which causes the lingam to break into pieces. The priest then wraps the broken lingam with butter and after few days the lingam becomes as it was.

References

Hindu temples in Himachal Pradesh
Buildings and structures in Kullu district